"The Man in Love with You" is a song written by Steve Dorff and Gary Harju, and recorded by American country music artist George Strait.  It was released in June 1994 as the fourth and final single from his album Easy Come Easy Go.  It peaked at number 4 in the United States, and number 2 in Canada.

Critical reception
Larry Flick, of Billboard magazine reviewed the song favorably, saying that "even up against a lush string section and a mean mess of chord changes, ol' George stays as cool as a cucumber."

Music video
This is one of the few of Strait's singles that has a music video. It was directed by Bill Young.

Chart positions
"The Man in Love with You" debuted at number 75 on the U.S. Billboard Hot Country Singles & Tracks for the week of June 25, 1994.

Year-end charts

References

1994 singles
1993 songs
George Strait songs
Song recordings produced by Tony Brown (record producer)
Songs written by Steve Dorff
MCA Records singles